Imperial Hotel, also known as Hotel Greenville, is a historic hotel building located at Greenville, South Carolina. It was built in 1911–1912, and is a seven-story, U-shaped skyscraper with a buff-colored brick veneer over a steel frame.  It was originally a 90-room hotel, and expanded by 1930 to 250 rooms. The hotel closed in the early 1970s, but this establishment is still used as a nursing home for disabled people 55 and over. An adjacent parking garage was demolished in the 1980s.

It was added to the National Register of Historic Places in 1982.

New owners of the building plan extensive building renovations in 2019.

References

Hotel buildings on the National Register of Historic Places in South Carolina
Commercial buildings completed in 1912
National Register of Historic Places in Greenville, South Carolina
1912 establishments in South Carolina